Pinback is the debut self-titled album by the indie rock band Pinback. There are at least two different versions of the album. The first version was released by Ace Fu Records on October 12, 1999. Another was released that same year in Europe by Cutty Shark Records. In the latter version two new tracks were added and the track ordering was also modified. Both "Versailles" and 'Byzantine" would later appear on the compilation, "Nautical Antiques".

The song "Hurley" samples drums from the song "It's Expected I'm Gone" by Minutemen (George Hurley was that band's drummer).

The song "Shag" samples drums from the song "Shaggs' Own Thing (Vocal Version)" by the Shaggs.

Track listings

The Ace Fu Records version
"Tripoli" – 4:30
"Hurley" – 3:55
"Charborg" – 3:28
"Chaos Engine" – 3:38
"Shag" – 3:05
"Loro" – 3:33
"Crutch" – 4:31
"Rousseau" – 5:08
"Lyon" – 5:18
"Montaigne" – 5:38

The Cutty Shark Records version
"Tripoli" – 4:30
"Hurley" – 3:55
"Charborg" – 3:28
"Chaos Engine" – 3:38
"Shag" – 3:06
"Lyon" – 5:20
"Loro" – 3:37
"Crutch" – 4:32
"Versailles" – 3:36
"Rousseau" – 5:09
"Byzantine" – 3:43
"Montaigne" – 5:37

References

External links
Official Pinback Website

Pinback albums
1999 debut albums
Ace Fu Records albums